MS Stena Superfast VII is a fast Ro-Pax ferry owned by Stena Line and operated on their service between Belfast and Cairnryan. Built in 2001 by Howaldtswerke-Deutsche Werft (HDW) in Kiel, Germany for Attica Group's subsidiary Superfast Ferries, The ship was sold to its current owners in 2017.

Concept and construction

Stena Superfast VII was the first ship in a series of four ice-classified ropax ferries built by HDW in Kiel for Superfast Ferries' Baltic Sea services. The ship was ordered in 1998, alongside sister ship , launched from dry dock on 8 November 2000 and was delivered to Superfast Ferries on 8 May 2001.

Service history

2001–06: Superfast Ferries
Following delivery the Superfast VII visited Rosyth, Scotland and Helsinki, Finland where it was displayed to the public. It inaugurated Superfast Ferries' Hanko (Finland) – Rostock (Germany) service on 17 May 2001. On 18 January 2002 a pregnant passenger went into labour on board while the Superfast VII was en route from Hanko to Rostock. Taking the ship to Karlshamn, Sweden, where the expecting mother could be taken to a hospital, was considered, but in the end the decision was made to bring a midwife on board by a pilot boat. The child had already been born by the time the midwife arrived on board, with the captain's wife assisting in childbirth.

On 12 November 2004 the Superfast VII was entering Hanko harbour in heavy wind with the help of two tugs when she was grounded near the Hanko breakwater at 19:24 Eastern European Time. The grounding resulted in no major damage and the ship was able to continue to the harbour soon afterwards. 140 passengers were on board at the time of the incident. Subsequent enquiries revealed the safety management system instructions provided for the crew by Superfast Ferries had not included instructions for port steering during a storm, which had led to an incorrect estimation of the wind effect and insufficient utilization of the ship's navigational equipment. Following the grounding the ship sailed to Turku Repair Yard in Naantali, Finland on 14 November 2004 and returned to service after repairs on 27 November 2004.

2006–11: Tallink
On 21 March 2006 Superfast Ferries sold their Baltic Sea operations (Superfast VII, Superfast VIII and ) to the Estonia-based Tallink, with the delivery date set for 10 April 2006. According to the agreement Tallink could continue utilising the Superfast brand until the end of 2007 at latest. Following delivery to the new owners the ship was moved from Finnish to Estonian registry, and the ship's route changed to Hanko–Paldiski–Rostock on 17 April 2006. The route change caused problems however as Estonia was not a member of the Schengen Treaty (unlike Finland and Germany), and passport control facilities had to be built in all ports. Already in June of the same year the route reverted to Hanko–Rostock. Around the same time the "Superfast" text on the ship's side was altered into "Superfast operated by Tallink".

The route of the Superfast VII was changed to Helsinki–Rostock on 1 January 2007 and Tallinn–Helsinki–Rostock on 14 January 2007. Coinciding with this all remaining Superfast logos on the ships were painted over with Tallink logos, but otherwise the original Superfast livery was maintained. Due to falling passenger numbers and rising fuel costs the route of Superfast VII and VIII will revert to Helsinki–Rostock in late 2008, while the Superfast IX will be chartered to Marine Atlantic in October 2008. Reportedly Tallink are considering the closure of the entire Tallink Superfast -division. In January 2010, the Superfast VII and her sister were removed from service and laid up in Tallinn, but they resumed service on the Helsinki-Rostock route at the end of April 2010 and continuing during the summer and autumn season. On 29 and 30 December 2010, Superfast VII replaced MS Superstar on the route Tallinn-Helsinki due to scheduled docking

2011 onwards: Stena Line
In March 2011, Stena Line announced they will be chartering the Superfast VII and sister ship Superfast VIII. Superfast VII and Superfast VIII commenced operations on 21 November 2011 after major refit by MJM Marine in Remontowa Shipyard in Poland. The vessels now operate between Belfast and Stena Line's new terminal at Cairnryan.  In February 2014, Stena renewed the charter of these ships until Autumn 2019. However, Stena decided to purchase both vessels outright for a combined price of €133.5m during 2017.

Conversion to day ferries 
Before the two ships entered service for Stena Line, an extensive refurbishment and conversion was undertaken in Gdańsk, Poland. As part of this conversion, the free height of the upper vehicle deck was raised to 5.05 m allowing Stena to carry full height freight.  Both ships also received an additional bow thruster to improve manoeuvrability.  This took their complement to three bow thrusters and one stern thruster.

As the new port in Scotland had an automated mooring system installed, the ships were also adapted to work with this by adding three steel bollards on the starboard side bow. The conversion of the vessels and construction of the new port in Scotland were part of a £200m rolling investment in the route between Scotland and Northern Ireland.

On 6 November 2018, Stena Superfast VII had a near-miss with a Royal Navy nuclear submarine submerged at periscope depth.

Other information 

Stena Superfast VII and Stena Superfast VIII are managed by Northern Marine Management, a Stena owned company.

References

External links

 Stena Superfast VII and VIII at NI Ferry Site
 Superfast VII at marinetraffic.com

Ferries of Estonia
Ferries of Finland
Ferries of Northern Ireland
Ferries of the United Kingdom
Ships built in Kiel
2000 ships
Ships of the Stena Line
07